Jacques Élie Henri Ambroise Ner (7 December 1861 – 6 February 1938), also known by the pseudonym Han Ryner, was a French individualist anarchist philosopher and activist and a novelist. He wrote for publications such as L'Art social, L'Humanité nouvelle, L'Ennemi du Peuple, L'Idée Libre de Lorulot; and L'En dehors and L'Unique of fellow anarchist individualist Émile Armand. His thought is mainly influenced by stoicism and epicureanism.

Life 

He was born in Nemours (now Ghazaouet, Tlemcen Province), Department of Orán, French Algeria in a modest religious family. After the death of his mother, he abandoned Catholicism, associated himself with Freemasons and started having an interest in social ideas.

He published 2 novels in 1894–1895 and later started working as a journalist. After that he took a teaching position but struggled at having to fit into such a disciplined environment. He becomes a prolific literary writer.

In 1896, he adopted the pseudonym "Han Ryner" and started writing for such magazines as L'Art social, L'Humanité nouvelle of Augustin Hamon, L'Ennemi du Peuple of Emile Janvion and L'Idée Libre. From here he started collaborating in the important individualist anarchist magazine L'EnDehors and L'Unique of Émile Armand.

In 1900 he wrote the essay Le crime d'obéir (the crime of obeying) and in 1903 he wrote the essay Petit manuel individualiste, in which he presented his anarchist individualist doctrine influenced by classic Greek stoicism in the works of Epictetus. By the 1920s his thought starts having an important influence in Spain within individualist anarchist circles especially through the translations of his work by Juan Elizalde. Han Ryner started writing in Spanish individualist journals such as Ética, which already had an important influence of the thought of Ryner. The Brazilian individualist anarchist Maria Lacerda de Moura took the task of making his philosophy and writing become known in the Portuguese-speaking world.

With the First World War approaching. Han Ryner embraced pacifist and anti-war positions and promotes conscience objection. In his anti-war activism he collaborates with Émile Armand.

He campaigned for the liberation of Eugène Dieudonné in 1913; for that of Émile Armand during the war; for the mutiny in the Black Sea, and for the Italian-American anarchists Nicola Sacco and Bartolomeo Vanzetti and for the Ukrainian anarchist Nestor Makhno.

In May 1922 he attended the International Congress of Progressive Artists and signed the "Founding Proclamation of the Union of Progressive International Artists".

A radical anticlerical, he adhered to the World Committee against War and Fascism. He also opposed World War I on pacifist anti militaristic grounds. He was a rare case of an anarchist participating in the Félibrige.

He died in Paris on 6 February 1938.

The individualist anarchism of Han Ryner 
 
The mature thought of Han Ryner is influenced by stoicism and epicureanism. From this first position he shows a tendency to fatalism towards the pains of life and those produced by society. He wrote in "Mini-manual of individualism", "The Stoic Epictetus courageously bore poverty and slavery. He was perfectly happy in the situations most painful to ordinary men." He then emphasized subjective will as a power which individuals can resort to.

He defined individualism as "the moral doctrine which, relying on no dogma, no tradition, no external determination, appeals only to the individual conscience". As models of individualists he names Socrates, Epicurus, Jesus and Epictetus and so these persons exemplify what he defines as "harmonic individualism". For example, he admires from Epicurus his temperance and that "he showed that very little was needed to satisfy hunger and thirst, to defend oneself against heat and the cold. And he liberated himself from all other needs, that is, almost all the desires and all the fears that enslave men.". From Jesus how "He lived free and a wanderer, foreign to any social ties. He was the enemy of priests, external cults and, in general, all organizations." From these individualists as he defines them he distinguishes "conquering and aggressive egoists who proclaim themselves to be individualists" such as Stendhal and Nietzsche.

Han Ryner, as well as fellow French individualist anarchist Émile Armand, regarded individualist anarchism above all as a way of life. He regarded that the individualist act must be in accord with his ideas and he calls that "virtue". For him, disinterested virtue creates happiness which for him meant feeling oneself free of all outside servitudes and in perfect accord with oneself.

In relationships with others and things outside the individual he saw "Every person is a goal, an end" and from this he saw that he can "ask people for services that they will freely accord me, either through benevolence or in exchange for other services". He defined society as "a gathering of individuals for a common labor." From society's evils he advocated developing individual resistance towards building up indifference. He understood happiness as something that can only be reached through oneself and sees that "Society has stolen from all, in order to turn over to a few, that great instrument of natural labor, the earth." He rejected crowds as he sees them as "the most brutal of natural forces."

He saw work as an evil worsened by society and that "1—It arbitrarily dispenses a certain number of men from all work and places their part of the burden on other men. 2—It employs many men at useless labors and social functions. 3—It multiplies among all, and particularly among the rich, imaginary needs and it imposes on the poor the odious labor necessary for the satisfaction of these needs."

In line with Stirner, he rejected sacrifices in the name of exterior "Idols" such as "In certain countries, the King or the Emperor, in others some fraud called the Will of the People. Everywhere Order, the Political party, Religion, the Fatherland, the Race, the Color." By color he meant race and he found deplorable that "The White color especially ... has managed to unite in one cult the French, Germans, Russians, and Italians and to obtain from these noble priests the bloody sacrifice of a great number of Chinese.... It is they who have made all of Africa a hell. It is they who destroyed the Indians of America and lynches Negroes."

See also
 List of peace activists

Written works 
 Chair vaincue, roman psychologique (1889)
 Les Chants du divorce, poésies (1892)
 L'Humeur inquiète (1894)
 La Folie de misère (1895)
 Le Crime d'obéir (1900)
 Le Soupçon (1900)
 L'Homme fourmi, novel illustrated by Alexis Mérodack-Jeanneau (1901)
 Les Voyages de Psychodore, philosophe cynique (1903) (translated by Brian Stableford and included in The Superhumans, q.v.)
 Petit Manuel individualiste (1903)
 La Fille manquée (1903) Rééd. QuestionDeGenre/GKC (2013)
 Petit Manuel individualiste (1903)
 Prostitués, études critiques sur les gens de lettres d'aujourd'hui (1904)
 Les Chrétiens et les philosophes (1906)
 Le Subjectivisme. Des bons et mauvais usages de la logique. La Métaphysique et les Sagesses positives. Le Déterminisme et la Liberté. Les Morales: Servilisme et Dominisme. Les Sagesses: Fraternisme et Subjectivisme. Les Étapes de la sagesse (1909)
 Vive le roi, hypothèse en 3 actes. Les Esclaves, vision en un acte (1910)
 Le Cinquième Évangile (1911)
 Le Fils du silence (1911)
 Les Paraboles cyniques (1913)
 Les Apparitions d'Ahasvérus v. 1913)
 Les Pacifiques (1914)
 Le Père Diogène (v. 1915–1935)
 Le Sphinx rouge (1918)
 Le Poison, drame en 1 acte (1919)
 La Tour des peuples (1919)
 Le Père Diogène (1920). Réédition: Premières Pierres, 2007.
 Dialogue du mariage philosophique ; suivi des Dicéphales (1922)
 Les Véritables entretiens de Socrate (1922)
 L'Individualisme dans l'antiquité (histoire et critique) (1924)
 Le Communisme et la Liberté (1924)
 Le Crime d'obéir, roman d'histoire contemporaine (1925)
 Jusqu'à l'âme: drame moderne en 2 actes (1925)
 L'Ingénieux Hidalgo Miguel Cervantès (1926)
 La Vie éternelle, roman du mystère (1926)
 Jésus est-il un personnage historique ou un personnage légendaire ? La Vérité sur Jésus (1926)
 L'Aventurier d'amour (1927)
 L'Amour plural, roman d'aujourd'hui et de demain (1927)
 Jeanne d'Arc fut-elle victime de l'Église ? (1927)
 La Sagesse qui rit (1928)
 Les Surhommes, roman prophétique (1929) (translated by Brian Stableford as The Superhumans)
 Songes perdus (1929)
 Chère Pucelle de France (1930)
 Prenez-moi tous ! (1930)
 Crépuscules. Bouddha. Platon. Épicure. Thraséas. Raymond Lulle. Rabelais. Leibniz. Hegel. Vigny. Élisée Reclus, etc. (1930)
 Le Manœuvre: pièce en 3 actes (1931)
 Dans le mortier. Zénon. Phocion, Saint Ignace ; Les Albigeois ; Michel Servet ; Pierre Ramus ; Vanini ; Brousson ; Francisco Ferrer (1932)
 La Soutane et le veston, roman (1932)
 Bouche d'or, patron des pacifistes (1934)
 La Cruauté de l'Église (1937)
 L'Église devant ses juges (1937)
 Le Massacre des amazones: études critiques sur deux cents bas-bleus contemporains: Mmes Adam, Sarah Bernhardt, Marie-Anne de Bovet, Bradamante, Jeanne Chauvin, Alphonse Daudet (s. d.)
 La Beauté: légende dramatique en quatre tableaux (1938)
 Florilège de paraboles et de songes (1942)
 Face au public. Première série, 1901–1919 (1948)
 J'ai mon Éliacin, souvenirs d'enfance (1956)
 Aux orties, souvenirs d'adolescence (1957)
 Le Sillage parfumé (1958)
 Les Grandes Fleurs du désert (1963)

References

View also 
Individualist anarchism in Europe

External links 
 
Han Ryner Archive including a translation of Mini-Manual of Individualism
Han Ryner blog
Bibliographical list of Han Ryner´s works
"Han Ryner or the Social Thinking of an Individualist in the Early Part of the 20th Century" by Gérard Lecha in French

1861 births
1938 deaths
19th-century French male writers
19th-century French non-fiction writers
19th-century French novelists
20th-century French male writers
20th-century French non-fiction writers
20th-century French novelists
Anarcho-pacifists
French anarchists
French anti-war activists
French male non-fiction writers
French male novelists
French pacifists
French philosophers
Individualist anarchists
Non-interventionism
People from Ghazaouet
Pieds-Noirs